Pedro Gregorio Armendáriz Hastings (May 9, 1912 – June 18, 1963) was a Mexican film actor who made films in both Mexico and the United States. With Dolores del Río and María Félix, he was one of the best-known Latin American movie stars of the 1940s and 1950s.

Early life
Armendáriz was born in Mexico City, to Pedro Armendáriz García Conde (Mexican) and Adela Hastings (American). He was also the cousin of actress Gloria Marín. Armendáriz and his younger brother Francisco lived with their uncle Henry Hastings Senior in Laredo, Texas, after their mother died. He later studied in California, attending the California Polytechnic State University from September 1928 to May 1932. At Cal Poly, he studied mechanics and in May 1931 graduated from the academic course of the school. He remained an additional year as a freshman in the Junior College division, but in 1932 returned to Mexico after the end of the school year. While at Cal Poly, Armendáriz was active in student activities, including editing the student newspaper and the student yearbook and acting in several student dramatic productions.

Career

When Armendáriz finished his studies, he moved to Mexico, where he worked for the railroad, as a tour guide, and as a journalist for the bilingual magazine México Real. He was discovered by film director Miguel Zacarías when Armendáriz recited a soliloquy from Hamlet to an American tourist. His meeting with the director Emilio Fernández was providential, whereupon the actor and director began working in numerous films: Soy puro mexicano (1942), Flor silvestre (1942) and specially María Candelaria (1943) were the first films of intense common path. Under the guidance of Emilio Fernández, Pedro Armendáriz developed the film personality traits of strong nationalist; often, he played tough and manly men, indigenous, peasants and revolutionaries. Amendáriz repeatedly portrayed Pancho Villa and played opposite actresses such as Dolores del Río and María Félix.

With Katy Jurado, Dolores del Río, Amendáriz formed one of the most legendary couples of the Mexican cinema. María Candelaria provided Armendáriz with international visibility. The film was awarded the Palme d'Or at the 1946 Cannes Film Festival. Other prominent titles where Armendáriz appeared with Dolores del Río were Las Abandonadas (1944), Bugambilia (1944) and La Malquerida (1949). Maria Felix was his other partner in such films as Enamorada (1946) or Maclovia (1948).

In the late 40s, he made the jump to Hollywood by the hand of John Ford. Armendáriz was a favorite of Ford, appearing in three of his films: The Fugitive (1947), Fort Apache and 3 Godfathers (both 1948).

Besides his career in the Mexican cinema, Armendáriz made a remarkable career in Hollywood and Europe. His other prominent films in Hollywood were: We Were Strangers (1949, directed by John Huston), The Torch (1950), Border River (1954), The Conqueror (1956) and Diane (1956), among others. In Europe, highlighted his participation in the film Lucrèce Borgia (1953), filmed in France. In Mexico, his participation highlighted such notable films such as El Bruto (1953, directed by Luis Buñuel), La Cucaracha (1959) and La Bandida (1962).

Armendáriz's last appearance was in the second James Bond film, From Russia with Love (1963), as Bond's ally, Kerim Bey. Armendáriz was terminally ill with cancer during the filming of From Russia with Love, and towards the end of shooting he was too ill to perform his part; his final scenes were performed by his double, director Terence Young. Armendáriz died four months before the release of the film.

Personal life
Armendáriz was married to actress Carmelita Bohr (née Pardo) by whom he had one son and daughter. Pedro Armendáriz, Jr. also became an actor and appeared in the James Bond film Licence to Kill (1989); his daughter Carmen Armendáriz became a TV producer.

Illness and death
In 1956, Armendáriz had a role in The Conqueror, produced by Howard Hughes. It was filmed in the state of Utah at the time when the US government was conducting atmospheric nuclear testing in neighboring Nevada. Within 25 years, 91 of the 220 people involved in the production (41%) developed cancer, 46 of whom died of cancer or complications related to it.

Armendáriz began to suffer pain in his hips; years later it was discovered that he had neck cancer. He learned his condition was terminal while at UCLA Medical Center in Los Angeles, California, and, reportedly, endured great pain to film From Russia with Love in order to assure his family financial resources.

On June 18, 1963, Armendáriz committed suicide by shooting himself in the chest with a gun he had smuggled into the hospital. He was 51 years old. He is buried in the Panteón Jardín cemetery in Mexico City, Mexico.

Filmography

Hollywood

British cinema

Italian cinema

French cinema

Mexican cinema

Bibliography
 
 Tierney, Dolores (2012). "Latino Acting On Screen: Pedro Armendáriz Performs Mexicanness in Three John Ford Films". Revista Canadiense de Estudios Hispanicos, 37 (1). pp. 111–134. .

References

External links

 
 
 
 Pedro Armendáriz  at the Cinema of Mexico site of the ITESM
 

1912 births
1963 deaths
Male actors from Mexico City
Mexican male film actors
American male film actors
Hispanic and Latino American male actors
Golden Age of Mexican cinema
Mexican people of American descent
Best Actor Ariel Award winners
Suicides by firearm in California
California Polytechnic State University alumni
Mexican emigrants to the United States
20th-century Mexican male actors
20th-century American male actors
Male Western (genre) film actors
Mexican expatriate actors in the United States
1963 suicides